Yekaterina Segeyevna Avvakumova (born 26 October 1990) is a Russian-born South Korean biathlete. She obtained Korean citizenship in 2017. She competed in the 2018 Winter Olympics.

References

External links

1990 births
Living people
Biathletes at the 2018 Winter Olympics
Biathletes at the 2022 Winter Olympics
Naturalized citizens of South Korea
Olympic biathletes of South Korea
Russian female biathletes
Russian emigrants to South Korea
South Korean female biathletes
Universiade silver medalists for Russia
Universiade medalists in biathlon
Competitors at the 2015 Winter Universiade
People from Veliky Ustyug
Sportspeople from Vologda Oblast